The Provisional Government of the Northern Region (Severnaya Oblast), also called Severnyy Krai, was a White movement, Anti-Bolshevik left-wing, and Allied provisional government and a krai of the Russian State.

History

On 28 September 1918, Provisional Government of the Northern Region was established. In October 1918, the Northern Region recognized the supreme authority of the Ufa Directory, along with abolishing all the soviets and restored zemstvos. On 30 April 1919, the Northern Region recognized the supreme authority of the Provisional All-Russian Government. On 19 October 1919, the Northern Region turned into department for civil affairs under chief administrator of Northern Region but use of former name (Provisional Government of the Northern Region) continued. On 19 February 1920, the Northern Region government evacuated from Arkhangelsk to Norway. On 21 February 1920, Arkhangelsk and Murmansk was reintegrated into the Russian Socialist Federative Soviet Republic. On 13 March 1920, regular Soviet troops reached Murmansk.

Administrative divisions

On 2 February 1920, the Murmansk Governorate was created by a resolution of the Provisional Government of the Provisional Government of the Northern Region. It included Alexandrovsky and Kemsky Uyezds of Arkhangelsk Governorate and parts of the Olonets Governorate.

Chairman of the Provisional Government of the Northern Region (Severnaya Oblast)

Acting Chairman of the Provisional Government of the Northern Region (Severnaya Oblast)

Chief administrator of Northern Region (Severnyy Krai)

Territorial control

During its height of control, the Provisional Government of the Northern Region controlled the overwhelming majority of the Arkhangelsk Governorate (using the 1917 governorate borders of the Russian Republic), about half of the Olonets Governorate (using the 1917 governorate borders of the Russian Republic), and a tiny part of the Vologda Governorate (using the 1917 governorate borders of the Russian Republic).

Maps

References 

1918 establishments in Russia
1920 disestablishments in Russia
Former administrative units of Russia
Provisional governments of the Russian Civil War
Russian Civil War
States and territories disestablished in 1920
States and territories established in 1918
White Russia